Gardiner High School is a public high school in Gardiner, Montana, United States. It is part of the Gardiner Public Schools district.

All Gardiner schools students attend school in the same building. It is located on the former grounds of the Northern Pacific Railway Gardiner station.

References

External links 
 

Education in Park County, Montana
Public high schools in Montana